Malika-e-Noor (born 11 July 1994) is a Pakistani footballer who is the vice-captain of the Pakistan women's national football team. She captains and plays as a defender for Pakistan Army, and as a midfielder for the national team. As of 2022, she has played in over 200 professional matches, with 94 goals to her name.

Club career

Young Rising Stars 
Malika scored the opening goal for Young Rising Stars in the final of the 2010 National Women Football Championship, as her side went on to win 2-0 against WAPDA. She won the Top Scorer award at the tournament.

In September 2011, Noor scored 14 goals and got 11 assists in Young Rising Stars' 25-0 win over Margala in the 7th National Women Football Championship. She also scored the equalizer in the final against Diya as YRS successfully defended their title. This helped her win the Top Scorer award at the tournament for the second consecutive time.

Pakistan Army 
At the 2014 edition, she played for Pakistan Army and scored 16 goals in 6 matches as her side came third. For her performances, she was awarded the Misha Dawood Trophy for being the best player of the tournament.

International career 
Noor scored the 89th-minute winning goal from the penalty spot in Pakistan's first competitive victory, at the 2010 SAFF Women's Championship. The team beat the Maldives 2–1 and she also served an assist for the national team's first-ever goal in the same match.

References

External links 
 Profile at Pakistan Football Federation (PFF)

Pakistani women's footballers
Pakistan women's international footballers
Living people
1994 births
People from Gilgit
Women's association football midfielders
Women's association football forwards
Young Rising Stars F.F.C. players